is a Japanese manga series written and illustrated by Daisuke Igarashi. It was serialized in Kodansha's Monthly Afternoon from April 2015 to March 2019, with its chapters collected in five tankōbon volumes.

Publication
Designs is written and illustrated by Daisuke Igarashi. It was serialized in Kodansha's Monthly Afternoon from April 25, 2015, to March 25, 2019. Kodansha collected its chapters in five tankōbon volumes, released from February 23, 2016, to November 22, 2019.

Volume list

Reception
The series ranked #9 on "The Best Manga 2017 Kono Manga wo Yome!" ranking by Freestyle magazine. Designs was nominated for the Yomiuri Shimbun's Sugoi Japan Award 2017. The series ranked #18 on Takarajimasha's Kono Manga ga Sugoi! guidebook 2017 list of top manga for male readers.

References

Further reading

External links
 

Kodansha manga
Science fiction anime and manga
Seinen manga